The 1914–15 Toronto Hockey Club season was the third season of the Toronto franchise in the National Hockey Association (NHA). Toronto finished third during the regular season and did not qualify for the playoffs.

Off-season
The Blueshirts lost their leading scorer Scotty Davidson who enlisted for World War I. Davidson would die while fighting overseas.

Regular season
Jack Marshall was stricken with appendicitis in January 1915 and only played four games this season. After Marshall's operation on January 8, owner Frank Robinson took over as manager and coach.

Final standings

Game log

See also
 1914–15 NHA season

References

Toronto Blueshirts seasons
Toronto Hockey Club season, 1914-15